CFDA may refer to:

 CFDA-FM, a radio station (101.9 FM) licensed to Victoriaville, Quebec, Canada
 Catalog of Federal Domestic Assistance, a federal assistance research guide
 China Food and Drug Administration, a Chinese certification authority
 Council of Fashion Designers of America
 Carboxyfluorescein diacetate, a fluorescent dye